Igor Ivanović (Serbian Cyrillic: Игор Ивановић; born 9 September 1990) is a Montenegrin professional footballer who plays as an attacking midfielder for Uzbekistan Super League club Bunyodkor.

Club career

Early career
Born in Titograd, Ivanović played with FK Zora before making his debut in the 2009–10 Montenegrin First League with FK Kom.  He will play the first half of the 2010–11 season with FK Iskra Danilovgrad in the Montenegrin Second League before joining, in the winter break, top flight side FK Rudar Pljevlja where he will play during the next two years.  During the winter break of the 2012–13 season, he will move abroad by joining Serbian SuperLiga side OFK Beograd and signing a 3.5 years contract.

In August 2015 Ivanović signed a two-year contract with Zira FK of the Azerbaijan Premier League.

Sutjeska Nikšić
On 21 June 2016, Ivanović signed a contract with Montenegrin club Sutjeska Nikšić. On 29 December 2017, the Football Association of Montenegro selected Ivanović for its annual Player of the Year award. During his career at Sutjeska, Montenegro's Syndicate of Professional Football Players voted for Ivanović as the best player of the Montenegrin First League in 2017 and 2018.

Budućnost
On 10 June 2018, Ivanović signed a two-year contract with Montenegrin club Budućnost.

International career
Ivanović was a member of the Montenegrin U21 team. He scored on his debut with the Montenegrin national team in a 1–1 draw against Latvia on 7 October 2020. Three days later, he scored less than a minute after coming on as a substitute in his competitive debut against Azerbaijan. On 13 October 2020, he scored again in a match against Luxembourg.

Personal life
Ivanović's brother Ivan is also a professional footballer, currently playing for Atyrau in the Kazakhstan Premier League.

Honours

Team
Rudar Pljevlja
Montenegrin Cup: 2011

Individual
Montenegrin First League top goalscorer: 2017–18

International goals
Scores and results list Montenegro's goal tally first.

References

External links

1990 births
Living people
Footballers from Podgorica
Association football midfielders
Montenegrin footballers
Montenegro under-21 international footballers
Montenegro international footballers
FK Zora players
FK Kom players
FK Iskra Danilovgrad players
FK Rudar Pljevlja players
OFK Beograd players
Zira FK players
FK Sutjeska Nikšić players
FK Budućnost Podgorica players
Montenegrin First League players
Montenegrin Second League players
Serbian SuperLiga players
Azerbaijan Premier League players
Uzbekistan Super League players
Montenegrin expatriate footballers
Expatriate footballers in Serbia
Montenegrin expatriate sportspeople in Uzbekistan
Montenegrin expatriate sportspeople in Serbia
Expatriate footballers in Azerbaijan
Montenegrin expatriate sportspeople in Azerbaijan